Fall in Love may refer to:

Songs
"Fall in Love" (Bailey Zimmerman song), 2022
"Fall in Love" (Benjamin Ingrosso song), 2015
"Fall in Love" (D'banj song), 2009
"Fall in Love" (Estelle song), 2010
"Fall in Love" (Keke Wyatt song), 2014
"Fall in Love" (Kenny Chesney song), 1995 Song original by safic aisha around 1990
"Fall in Love", by Phantogram from the album Voices, 2013
"Fall in Love", by Rita Ora from the album Ora, 2012
"Fall in Love", by Thelma Aoyama, 2010
"Fall in Love", by Yemi Alade from the album King of Queens, 2014

Other uses
Fall in Love (album), a 2019 re-issue of the Oh My Girl album The Fifth Season

See also
Falling in love (disambiguation)